Original Ärztesoundtrack zum Film "Richy Guitar" is a single-soundtrack by German rock band Die Ärzte for the film Richy Guitar, which featured the band in leading roles. All the tracks were later re-released on Devil.

Track listing 

 "Teenager Liebe" ["Teenager love"] - 2:54*
 "Grace Kelly" - 2:18
 "Ärztetheme" - 1:55 *
Note: * - featuring Axel Knabben on saxophone

1985 singles